Cielito "Honeylet" Salvador Avanceña (born February 17, 1970) is a Filipina businesswoman who is best known for being the current partner of the 16th President of the Philippines, Rodrigo Duterte. Avanceña and Duterte have been in a relationship since at least 1996 and have a daughter named Veronica.

Biography
Honeylet Avanceña first met Rodrigo Duterte, who would later become President of the Philippines and her partner, shortly after she participated at the 1988 Mutya Ng Dabaw pageant where she finished as first runner-up. Avanceña would work as a nurse in the United States for four years. She returned to Davao shortly after her daughter was born in 2004.

She joined her partner's presidential campaign in Luzon during the 2016 elections.

Prior to President Rodrigo Duterte's presidency, Avanceña ran several businesses in Davao namely a meat shop, a canteen catering service and 11 Mister Donut franchises.

Status as First Lady 
Shortly after the inauguration of her husband as president, Avanceña was not named as First Lady. Her step-daughter Sara was proposed to fulfill the role instead who declined the offer. 

Avanceña nevertheless would fulfill roles usually conducted by the First Lady such as during the official visit of Japanese Prime Minister Shinzo Abe, and the 30th ASEAN Summit in 2017.

References

1970 births
21st-century Filipino businesspeople
Cielito Avancena
Filipino nurses
Living people
Rodrigo Duterte
Spouses of presidents of the Philippines